Operation Agreement was a ground and amphibious operation carried out by British, Rhodesian and New Zealand forces on Axis-held Tobruk from 13 to 14 September 1942, during the Second World War. A Special Interrogation Group party, fluent in German, took part in missions behind enemy lines. Diversionary actions extended to Benghazi (Operation Bigamy), Jalo oasis (Operation Nicety) and Barce (Operation Caravan). The Tobruk raid was an Allied disaster; the British lost several hundred men killed and captured, one cruiser, two destroyers, six motor torpedo boats and dozens of small amphibious craft.

Background
The objective of Operation Agreement was to undermine the Axis war effort in North Africa by destroying airfields, harbour facilities, supply ships, vehicles and large oil stores. The Allies also intended to capture Jalo oasis, which was to be used as a rendezvous for the retreating ground forces involved in the other operations.

Prelude
G1 and T1 patrols of the Long Range Desert Group (LRDG) with 50 men, 12 light trucks and five jeeps assaulted Barce airfield and the main barracks, destroying 16 aircraft and damaging seven more. In the attack on the barracks, the LRDG lost four men and two vehicles. Near Zaptié the LRDG force was intercepted by an Italian motorised company with all but two lorries damaged or destroyed. The Italians took seven New Zealanders and three Rhodesians prisoner, all injured. After a year, four of the New Zealanders were able to escape.
Lieutenant Colonel David Stirling and a party of the Special Air Service, supported by S1 and S2 patrols of the LRDG, were to attempt a big raid on Benghazi but after running late, their presence was discovered after a clash at a roadblock as dawn broke. With the element of surprise lost and the protection of darkness receding, Stirling ordered a withdrawal. The attack on Jalo Oasis was carried out by the Sudan Defence Force and S1 and S2 patrols of the LRDG. The first attack on the night of 15/16 September, was easily repelled by the defenders, who were on the alert and had been reinforced. The attackers withdrew on 19 September as an Italian relief column approached the oasis.

Main attack
Operation Agreement involved an amphibious force of about 400 Royal Marines, 180 Argyll and Sutherland Highlanders (Captain Norman MacFie), 14 Platoon, Z Company, I Battalion, Royal Northumberland Fusiliers (Lieutenant Ernest Raymond), and army engineers, and Force B (Lt. Col. John Edward Haselden), about 150 SAS approaching from the desert. The amphibious force was split into Force A, supported by destroyers and intended to land the marines on the peninsula north of Tobruk, while Force C, composed of coastal units, was directed towards an inlet east of Tobruk harbour. Force B captured an Italian 152 mm coastal battery but this was quickly retaken by Italian marines from the San Marco Battalion. Haselden was killed in action. Most of the shore batteries and positions remained in Axis hands.

Force A 
Force E, a group of commandos from the submarine  failed to set up beacons on the shore to guide the main British force, due to the bad sea conditions. The garrison had been reinforced and the destroyers  and  bringing in the seaborne troops landed them on the wrong beach, far to the west of the intended landing place. The British destroyer Sikh, which led the landing attempt, was hit by Italian 152 mm (6-inch) shore batteries and German 88 mm anti-tank guns, while taking on troops. Zulu had gone to the rescue but was unable to pull Sikh clear and it eventually sank; 122 members of the crew were reported killed and the survivors, most of them rescued from the water by the retreating amphibious boats, were eventually taken prisoner. On the afternoon of 14 September, while returning to Alexandria,  was badly damaged by German Ju 87 dive-bombers from Crete and 63 crew were killed. Coventry was scuttled by Zulu which was hit by German Ju-87 and  Ju-88 dive-bombers  a little later.

Force C 

Another landing by Motor Launches and boats, carrying a detachment of Argyll and Sutherland Highlanders and a machine-gun platoon of Royal Northumberland Fusiliers, whose Vickers machine guns were to defend the perimeter, partially failed to reach the landing point. Because of extremely heavy fire from Tobruk harbour, only two launches, MTB 261 and MTB 314, made it into Marsa Umm el Sciausc, the target cove. MTB 314 became stranded in the shallow water, but MTB 261 managed to land Sergeant 'Dusty' Miller and his group of Geordie Fusiliers and sail out. The motor launches ML 353, Ml 352 and ML 349 and 17 MTBs were beaten back by boom defences and an Italian flotilla of torpedo boats and armed motor barges. Three MTBs launched torpedoes at the naval vessels in harbour, to no avail. ML 353 was set on fire and scuttled, either hit by the Italian warships or strafed by Italian Macchi C.200 fighters, while ML 352, MTB 308, MTB 310 and MTB 312 were lost to Axis aircraft. MTB 314, the motor torpedo boat that was damaged and run aground during the battle, was captured by the German harbour minesweeper R-10 at dawn, with 117 seamen and soldiers on board. Although they were frequently dive-bombed and strafed during their return journey, the bulk of the MTBs and the surviving ML reached Alexandria.

Aftermath

A number of makeshift motor amphibious craft, stragglers from Force A, attempting to reach Alexandria at very low speed, were also captured with their crews. The commander of Sikh, Captain John Micklethwait, was taken prisoner when an Italian motor barge seized one of the Royal Marines' amphibious vessels and the two lighters the motor boat was towing. A dinghy manned by the survivors of ML 352 following the same escape route was caught by Castore at midday. Losses amounted to about 300 Royal Marines, 160 soldiers, 280 sailors, the anti-aircraft cruiser Coventry, the destroyers Sikh and Zulu, two motor launches, four MTBs and several small amphibious craft. The Royal Marines suffered 81 killed and the Navy suffered the loss of another 217 men in the ship sinkings; about 576 survivors were taken prisoner. Axis losses were 15 Italians and one German killed, 43 Italians and seven Germans wounded.

See also

 List of British military equipment of World War II
 List of German military equipment of World War II
 List of Italian Army equipment in World War II
 North African campaign timeline
 Battle of the Mediterranean
 List of World War II battles
 British Commandos

Notes

Footnotes

References

Further reading
 
 Jefferson, David (2013). Tobruk: A Raid Too Far. Robert Hale Ltd 978-0709092988.
 Landsborough, Gordon (2015) [1956]. Tobruk Commando: The Raid to Destroy Rommel's Base. Barnsley: Frontline Books ISBN 978-1848322448.
 Lewis, Damien (2017). SAS Ghost Patrol: The Ultra-Secret Unit That Posed As Nazi Stormtroopers. Hachette UK. ISBN 978 1786483133.
 Mattesini, Francesco (2020). Disaster at Tobruk The Planning of the British "Daffodil" and "Agreement" Missions. Luca Cristini Editore. (Also published in Italian as Il disastro di Tobruk). 
 
 
 
 Sadler, John (2016). Operation Agreement: Jewish Commandos and the Raid on Tobruk. Osprey Publishing. ISBN 978-1472814883.
 Smith, Peter C. (1987). Massacre at Tobruk. William Kimber. ISBN 978-0718306649.
 Sugarman, Martin. 'The SIG: behind enemy lines with Jewish Commandos' in Jewish Historical Studies Vol. 35 (1996-1998) pp. 287-307.
 Swindon, Arthur (1974) [1968]. The Raiders: Desert Strike Force. London: Pan Books. ISBN 0330240064. pp. 118-49.

Conflicts in 1942
1942 in Libya
Battles and operations of World War II involving Italy
Battles and operations of World War II involving New Zealand
World War II British Commando raids
Western Desert campaign
Military operations of World War II involving Germany
Italian naval victories in the battle of the Mediterranean
Amphibious operations of World War II
September 1942 events
Amphibious operations involving the United Kingdom
Naval aviation operations and battles